Brom may refer to:

People
 Cor Brom (1932–2008), Dutch footballer
 Gerald Brom (born 1965), American fantasy artist
 Gustav Brom (1921–1995), Czech band leader
 David Brom (born 1971), American murderer
 Robert Brom (1938-2022), American Roman Catholic bishop
 Martin D. Brom (1880–1954), American politician
 Walter Brom (1921–1968), Polish football goalkeeper

Botany
 Brom (grape), another name for the French wine grape Aramon blanc which is a color mutation of Aramon noir
 Brom, the abbreviation for the orchid genus Bromheadia
 Brom, a short name for bromeliads, plants in the botanical family Bromeliaceae

Fictional characters
Brom, a character in the Inheritance Cycle fantasy series
Brom Bones, a character from The Legend of Sleepy Hollow and the movie adaptation The Adventures of Ichabod and Mr. Toad
Brom Garret, a character in the HBO TV series Deadwood
Brom Titus, a character in the television series Star Wars Rebels

See also
 Bromine, a chemical element
 West Brom (disambiguation)